The sixth series of the British historical drama television series Downton Abbey broadcast from 20 September 2015 to 8 November 2015, comprising a total of eight episodes and one Christmas Special episode broadcast on 25 December 2015. The series was broadcast on ITV in the United Kingdom and on PBS in the United States, which supported the production as part of its Masterpiece Classic anthology.

Cast and characters

Main cast

Upstairs
Hugh Bonneville as Robert Crawley, Earl of Grantham
Laura Carmichael as Lady Edith Crawley
Michelle Dockery as Lady Mary Crawley
Elizabeth McGovern as Cora Crawley, Countess of Grantham
Maggie Smith as Violet Crawley, Dowager Countess of Grantham
Penelope Wilton as Mrs Isobel Crawley

Downstairs
Jim Carter as Mr Charles Carson; the Butler
Phyllis Logan as Mrs Elsie Hughes; the Housekeeper
Brendan Coyle as Mr John Bates; Lord Grantham's valet
Joanne Froggatt as Miss Anna Smith; head housemaid
Lesley Nicol as Mrs Beryl Patmore; the cook
Sophie McShera as Daisy Robinson; a kitchen maid

Episodes

References

External links
 

Downton Abbey series